Tahab is a notified area and town in Pulwama district of Jammu and Kashmir in India and is governed by Tahab Gram Panchayat.

See also
Chakoora Pulwama
Wasoora Pulwama

References

Cities and towns in Pulwama district